Proctor Creek is a stream in Morgan County in the U.S. state of Missouri. It is a tributary to the Osage River within the Lake of the Ozarks.

Proctor Creek has the name of Benjamin Proctor, an early citizen.

See also
List of rivers of Missouri

References

Rivers of Morgan County, Missouri
Rivers of Missouri